Nadya Romeo (sometimes Nadia Romeo) (born 1 June 1971 in Perth, Western Australia) is a wheelchair basketball player from Australia.

Life
Romeo made the Northern Territory state team with Mellissa Dunn. She was selected for the Australian Women's wheelchair basketball team  and she joined them at the Paralympics in Sydney in 2000. The team included her previous teammate Dunn and Melanie Hall. She was part of the silver medal-winning Australia women's national wheelchair basketball team at the 2000 Summer Paralympics.

References

Paralympic wheelchair basketball players of Australia
Paralympic silver medalists for Australia
Wheelchair category Paralympic competitors
Wheelchair basketball players at the 2000 Summer Paralympics
Living people
Medalists at the 2000 Summer Paralympics
1971 births
Paralympic medalists in wheelchair basketball